Eichorst Island is a small island whose west end is deeply cleft into three parts, giving the appearance of three separate rocks at high tide, lying between Shortcut Island and Surge Rocks off the southwest coast of Anvers Island. Eichorst Island was named by the United States Advisory Committee on Antarctic Names (US-ACAN) for Marvin H. (Ike) Eichorst of Glenview, Illinois, licensed operator of amateur radio station W9RUK who handled radio traffic between points in the United States and Palmer Station during the period 1964–1972.

See also
 Composite Antarctic Gazetteer
 List of Antarctic and sub-Antarctic islands
 List of Antarctic islands south of 60° S
 SCAR
 Territorial claims in Antarctica

References

Islands of the Palmer Archipelago